William Barclay Squire (16 October 1855 – 13 January 1927) was a British musicologist, librarian and librettist.

Biography
William Barclay Squire was a devoted music enthusiast. He spent 35 years of his life (1885-1920) working for the British Museum, where he took charge of the collections of the music department and added many antiquarian publications to it. He was also music critic for The Saturday Review between 1888 and 1894.

Squire prepared the publishing of the Catalogue of Printed Music before 1801 (edited in 1912) and negotiated the deposit of the Royal Music Collection, for which he prepared the catalogue. He contributed numerous articles to the Encyclopædia Britannica of 1911, to the Dictionary of National Biography and to the Dictionary of Music and Musicians.

Occasionally, Squire acted as a librettist. His main work was the libretto for The Veiled Prophet, a Romantic Opera in 3 acts composed by Charles Villiers Stanford, adapted from the homonymous ballad in Thomas Moore's oriental romance Lalla Rookh, published 1890.

See also
 Vienna Café

References

Further reading

External links

1885 births
1927 deaths
English opera librettists
Contributors to the Encyclopædia Britannica
English male dramatists and playwrights
20th-century English dramatists and playwrights
Contributors to the Dictionary of National Biography
20th-century English male writers
20th-century British musicologists
Music librarians
19th-century musicologists